Thomas Bayley may refer to:
Thomas Bayley (politician) (1846–1906), English politician
Thomas Bayley (academic) (died 1706), English academic
Thomas Butterworth Bayley (1744–1802), English magistrate, agriculturist and philanthropist
Tom Bayley (footballer, born 1868) (1868–?), English footballer
Tom Bayley (footballer, born 1921) (1921–1996), English footballer

See also
Thomas Bailey (disambiguation)
Thomas Bayley Potter (1817–1898), British Liberal Party politician
Thomas Bayly (disambiguation)
Thomas Baillie (disambiguation)